Brad Lang is an American bassist who is well respected in the rock music community. He played with Y&T replacing Phil Kennemore after he was diagnosed with lung cancer. He later played with Bobby Blotzer’s Ratt. He currently is playing with the BulletBoys.

Career
Brad Lang is from Lodi, California. He began playing bass guitar after watching a friend playing bass guitar in the junior high school band. He loved how the low end of the sound drove the whole thing along. When he moved to high school, he began playing and was soon in a band named "Misty Island Evil".

In 1886, he joined the band Jet Red. Jet Red was a popular Central Valley band led by Willie Hines and included Billy Carmassi (drums) and Johnny Feikert (guitar). Jet Red produced its debut album in 1989. The album was well received but Relativity Records did not provide the proper marketing and tour support thus dooming the release. Various demo recordings were made for the follow up album in 1991. This material was eventually released in 2010 with the album entitled "Flight Plan". 

In July 2010, he was contacted by Y&T as they had learned that original bassist Phil Kennemore was diagnosed with lung cancer and unable to tour. In less than 24 hours, he learned the setlist and was on a plane to Wisconsin to play the next day. Upon Kennemore’s passing in 2011, he was asked to become a full time member of Y&T.

In 2016, he left Y&T amicably due to personal reasons.

In 2018, he joined Bobby Blotzer’s Ratt. This version of Ratt was derailed by a series of lawsuits.

He played with Dennis DeYoung in 2018 and 2019 when his bass player was unable to perform.

He joined Burning Rain in 2019 to record the album "Face The Music" and tour.

He played in a Christmas Holiday musical experience named Luminare in 2021.

In 2022, he was asked to join the BulletBoys.

Discography
 Jet Red (1989)
 Jet Red “Flight Plan” (2010)
 Y&T “Live At The Mystic” (2012)
 Willie Hines “Letters To Maria” (2018)
 Burning Rain “Face The Music” (2019)

Contributions
 Tommy Tutone “Tutone.rft” (1998)
 Nick Haydn “Global Fusion” (2001)
 Concert For Ronnie Montrose “Good Rockin’ Tonight” DVD (2013)

References

External links

 Brad Lang Jet Red FAQ 

Living people
1962 births